Tarquini is an Italian surname. Notable people with this surname include:

 Camillo Tarquini (1810–1874), Italian Jesuit and Cardinal of the Roman Catholic Church
 Gabriele Tarquini (born 1962), Italian racing driver
 Gregorio Tarquini (died 1145), Italian cardinal of the Roman Catholic Church
 Jonatan Tarquini (born 1994), Argentine footballer 
 Tarquinia Tarquini  (1882-1976), Italian dramatic soprano and wife of Riccardo Zandonai

Italian-language surnames